Hillary Wilson (born 3 April 1945) is a Rhodesian former swimmer. She competed in three events for Rhodesia at the 1960 Summer Olympics.

References

1945 births
Living people
Rhodesian female swimmers
Olympic swimmers of Rhodesia
Swimmers at the 1960 Summer Olympics
Sportspeople from Pretoria
South African emigrants to Rhodesia
White Rhodesian people